Sergei Stepashin's Cabinet was the Cabinet of Russian Prime Minister Sergei Stepashin from May to August 1999.  The Cabinet served under the presidency of Boris Yeltsin.

Upon his appointment as Prime Minister (by a Duma vote of 301 to 55), Stepashin publicly identified a series of problems that he said faced the country, including high rates of poverty, low industrial output, high public debt and a weak legal environment. 

The Cabinet, and Stepashin's premiership, lasted only until August, when Yeltsin dismissed them. Stepashin stated upon his removal that "these three months haven't been wasted, we have managed to keep the situation in the country under control. The ruble hasn't plunged contrary to many predictions". Stepashin was replaced by Vladimir Putin.

Members
Members of the Cabinet:

|}

References

Stepashin
1999 establishments in Russia
Cabinets established in 1999
Cabinets disestablished in 1999